National Route 374 is a national highway of Japan connecting Bizen, Okayama and Tsuyama, Okayama in Japan, with a total length of 58 km (36.04 mi).

References

National highways in Japan
Roads in Okayama Prefecture